This is a list of seasons played by Bath City Football Club in English football, from the year they first turned competitive in 1908 in the Western League, to the present day. In 1889 Bath City were formed as Bath AFC and began to play at the North Parade Ground, making them one of England's most senior non league football clubs. In 1908, they commenced playing competitive league format football, joining the Western League Division Two. And moved up to Western League division 1, in which they were runners up in the 1913–14 season. Bath remained in the western league until 1921, in which they joined the Southern league English section, the fourth tier at the time. After the 1921 reform, the English non league structure was changed, with division three (Southern league) becoming the English Football League's new Third Division. As a result, non-League football went from hosting tiers three and four to tiers four and five.

Almost a decade later, Bath were crowned Champions in 1929–30 but lost 3–2 in the play offs to Eastern Section Champions Aldershot Town in 1930, so did not get promoted to the Southern League division 1, (the fourth division.) In 1933, Bath won the Southern League again, but lost in the final to play-off Eastern Section Champions Norwich City 2–1. Bath remained in the Southern League until 1939, with Liverpool legend and Scottish international, Alex Raisbeck as first team coach from 1938 to 1939. Upon outbreak of the Second World War, Bath were, by chance, accepted to join the temporary Football League North, competing with the likes of Liverpool, Manchester United, Aston Villa and Everton, finishing the eventual champions, thereby becoming the only semi-professional side ever to win a Football League trophy. After the War they were forced to resume playing in the Southern Premier Division, which was the 5th tier at the time. Bath won the league in the 1959–60 season. A year later they were runners up in the same league.

In 1959, the Southern league was added to the football league, as the Fourth Division, thus non league football went from hosting tiers four, five, to tiers five and six. Bath's history is entirely in non-league football, predominantly in the 5th tier. Bath narrowly missed out on election to the Football League by a few votes in 1978 and again in 1985. The club have a good history in the FA Cup, reaching the Third Round six times, and have beaten league sides including Crystal Palace (in 1931), Millwall (in 1959), and Cardiff City (in 1992).

In total, Bath have won two Southern League Western Section (Tier 4) titles - 1929–30, 1930–33,  two Southern League (Tier 5) titles - 1959–60, 1977–78, one Conference South (Tier 6) play off, one Southern Football League (Tier 7) title - 2006–07, One Southern League Cup, one non league championship trophy, one Football League North - 1943–44 and twenty four Somerset Premier Cups.

Key 

 Pld = Matches played
 W = Matches won
 D = Matches drawn
 L = Matches lost
 GF = Goals for
 GA = Goals against
 Pts = Points
 Pos = Final position

 F = Final
 Group = Group stage
 QF = Quarter-finals
 QR1 = First qualifying round
 QR2 = Second qualifying round
 QR3 = Third qualifying round
 QR4 = Fourth qualifying round
 RInt = Intermediate round

 R1 = Round 1
 R2 = Round 2
 R3 = Round 3
 R4 = Round 4
 R5 = Round 5
 R6 = Round 6
 SF = Semi-finals

Seasons

Overall
 Seasons spent at Level 4 of the football league system: 31
 Seasons spent at Level 5 of the football league system: 40
 Seasons spent at Level 6 of the football league system: 27
 Seasons spent at Level 7 of the football league system: 3

Footnotes

References 

 

English football club seasons
Football-related lists
Bath City F.C.-related lists